Gargul-e Sofla (also Romanized as Gargūl-e Soflá; also known as Gargol, Gargūl-e Pā'īn, and Gergol) is a village in Lahijan-e Sharqi Rural District, Lajan District, Piranshahr County, West Azerbaijan Province, Iran. At the 2006 census, its population was 620, in 101 families.

References 

Populated places in Piranshahr County